Danny Clyde Reeves (born August 1, 1957) is the Chief United States district judge of the United States District Court for the Eastern District of Kentucky.

Early life and education
Born in Corbin, Kentucky, Reeves received a Bachelor of Arts degree from Eastern Kentucky University in 1978 and a Juris Doctor from Salmon P. Chase College of Law at Northern Kentucky University in 1981.

He was a law clerk to Judge Eugene E. Siler, Jr. of the United States District Court for the Eastern & Western Districts of Kentucky from 1981 to 1983. He was in private practice in Kentucky from 1983 to 2001.

Federal judicial service
Reeves is a United States District Judge of the United States District Court for the Eastern District of Kentucky. Reeves was nominated by President George W. Bush on September 4, 2001, to a new seat created by 114 Stat. 2762. He was confirmed by the United States Senate on December 6, 2001, and received his commission on December 10, 2001. He became Chief Judge on August 16, 2019.

United States Sentencing Commission
On March 15, 2016, President Barack Obama nominated Reeves for a position on the United States Sentencing Commission, which would expire on October 31, 2021. On July 13, 2016, a hearing on his nomination was held before the Senate Judiciary Committee. His nomination expired with the end of the 114th Congress on January 3, 2017. He was renominated by President Obama on January 17, 2017. His nomination was withdrawn by President Donald Trump on February 28, 2017, but Trump renominated him on March 1, 2017. On March 9, 2017, his nomination was reported out of committee. On March 21, 2017, his nomination was confirmed by a vote of 98–0. His term ended in March 2021.

References

Sources

1957 births
Living people
21st-century American judges
Eastern Kentucky University alumni
Judges of the United States District Court for the Eastern District of Kentucky
Members of the United States Sentencing Commission
People from Corbin, Kentucky
Salmon P. Chase College of Law alumni
United States district court judges appointed by George W. Bush